Transcortin, also known as corticosteroid-binding globulin (CBG) or serpin A6, is a protein produced in the liver in animals. In humans it is encoded by the SERPINA6 gene. It is an alpha-globulin.

Function 
This gene encodes an alpha-globulin protein with corticosteroid-binding properties. This is the major transport protein for glucocorticoids and progestins in the blood of most vertebrates. The gene localizes to a chromosomal region containing several closely related serine protease inhibitors (serpins).

Binding
Transcortin binds several steroid hormones at high rates:

 Cortisol - Approximately 90% of the cortisol in circulation is bound to transcortin. (The rest is bound to serum albumin.) Cortisol is thought to be biologically active only when it is not bound to transcortin.
 Cortisone
 Deoxycorticosterone (DOC)
 Corticosterone - About 78% of serum corticosterone is bound to transcortin.
 Aldosterone - Approximately 17% of serum aldosterone is bound to transcortin, while another 47% is bound to serum albumin. The remaining 36% is free.
 Progesterone - Approximately 18% of serum progesterone is bound to transcortin, while another 80% of it is bound to serum albumin. The remaining 2% is free.
 17α-Hydroxyprogesterone

In addition, approximately 4% of serum testosterone is bound to transcortin. A similarly small fraction of serum estradiol is bound to transcortin as well.

Synthesis 
Transcortin is produced by the liver and is increased by estrogens.

Clinical significance 
Mutations in this gene are rare. Only four mutations have been described, often in association with fatigue and chronic pain. This mechanism for these symptoms is not known. This condition must be distinguished from secondary hypocortisolism.  Exogenous hydrocortisone does not appear to improve the fatigue.

Hepatic synthesis of corticosteroid-binding globulin more than doubles in pregnancy; that is, bound plasma cortisol in term pregnancy is approximately 2 to 3 times that of nonpregnant women.

See also
 Serpin
 Circaseptan, 7-day biological cycle

References

Further reading

External links 
 
 The MEROPS online database for peptidases and their inhibitors: I04.954
 

Glycoproteins